Jonathan Wilhelmsson (born October 31 1991) is a Swedish director and filmmaker. He is best known for his low-budget short films Waltzing Tilda and Untitled Earth Sim 64.

Wilhelmsson was born in Mockfjärd, Sweden where he started making films with his father's home video camera. He later studied at Sydney Film School in Australia.

Select filmography 

 Naomi and the Heartbreakers (2013)
 A Squeal in the Hamsterwheel (2016)
 Waltzing Tilda (2017)
 Alone in New York (2018)
 Mighty Jobs (TV Series documentary, 2018-2020)
 Untitled Earth Sim 64 (2021)

References

External links 

Jonathan Wilhelmsson on YouTube

1991 births
Living people
Swedish filmmakers